Thug Brothers 2 is a collaborative studio album by rappers Krayzie Bone of Bone Thugs-n-Harmony & Young Noble of Outlawz. It was released on June 16, 2017 on Real Talk Entertainment. The first Thug Brothers album released in 2006, was a collaborative effort by Layzie Bone and Young Noble, but for the sequel, Krayzie Bone picks up where Layzie Bone left off. A sequel album Thug Brothers 3 was released the same year on October 6, 2017.

Track listing

References

External links 
 
 

2017 albums
Krayzie Bone albums
Young Noble albums
Collaborative albums
Real Talk Entertainment albums
Sequel albums